Ebru Topçu (born August 27, 1996) is a Turkish women's football striker currently playing in the Turkish Women's First Football League for Galatasaray in Istanbul with jersey number 16. She was admitted to the Turkey women's national football team in 2013 after playing for the national U-15, U-17 and U-19 teams.

Early life
Ebru Topçu was born on August 27, 1996, in Karadeniz Ereğli town of Zonguldak Province. Her father was a coal miner working in the Armutçuk coal mine. She has a one-year older brother, who is a professional footballer.

Football was a main theme at her home. During her childhood, she played football along with her neighbor Berna Yeniçeri and her brother's friends. Her father, who also played football in his youth, took her to the newly established women's team Kdz. Ereğlispor and registered her at the age of only 10.

Playing career
During her high school years, she was a member of the school football team, which became Turkish champion in the 2013–14 season.

Topçu plays as midfielder in her club while she is a center-forward in the national team.

Club career

She began football playing in the internal feeder team of Kdz. Ereğlispor in 2006. The talented girl took part at a total of 110 matches until September 2013, including 80 league matches, 8 UEFA championship and 22 friendly international matches. A star of her club, she scored 92 goals in that time.

Topçu was transferred by the league-champion of the 2013–14 season Konak Belediyespor on July 25, 2014. She took part at the 2014–15 UEFA Women's Champions League qualifying round matches. In the first two games, she scored three goals for her new team. Topçu played in three matches of the 2015–16 UEFA Women's Champions League qualifying round, and scored one goal.

At the end of the 2015–16 season, she enjoyed her team's champion title. She played in three matches of the Group 9 of the 2016–17 UEFA Women's Champions League qualifying round.

By mid August, she transferred to the Istanbul-based rival Ataşehir Belediyespor after three seasons with Konak Belediyespor.

In the 2018–19 First League season, she returned to her former club Konak Belediyespor.

ALG Spor
The next season, she moved to the Gaziantep-based club ALG Spor.  She played at the 2020–21 UEFA Women's Champions League qualifying round against the Albanian team KFF Vllaznia Shkodër in Shkodër, Albania on 3 November 2020, and scored one goal in the penalty shoot-out. She enjoyed the 2021-22 Women's Super League champion title of her team.

Galatasaray
On 9 August 2022, she transferred to the Women's Super League  club Galatasaray.

International career

At the age of 14, she was admitted to the Turkey Girls' U-15 team. In her ever first international match, she scored three goals against the Russian girls on November 23, 2010.

Topçu played at the 2012 UEFA Women's Under-17 Championship qualification matches in 2011 and at the 2013 UEFA Women's Under-17 Championship qualifications in 2012.

In 2012, she scored one of the three goals for the Turkey women's U-19 team against the team from Ukraine at the International Kuban Spring Tournament. She shot two goals at the 2014 UEFA Women's Under-19 Championship qualification against Montenegro. On November 28, 2013, she scored the third goal for Turkey in the 2015 FIFA Women's World Cup qualification – UEFA Group 6 match against Montenegrin team that ended with 3–1.

In 2014, she debuted in the Turkey women's U-21 team's friendly match against Belgium, and scored a goal.

Career statistics
.

Honours
 Turkish Women's First League
 Kdz. Ereğlispor
 Third places (2): 2011–12, 2012–13

 Konak Belediyespor
 Winners (3): 2014–15, 2015–16, 2016–17
 Third places (1): 2018–19

 Ataşehir Belediyespor
 Winners (1): 2017–18

 ALG Spor
 Winners (2): 2019–20, 2021-22
 Third places (1): 2020–21

References

1996 births
Living people
People from Karadeniz Ereğli
Turkish women's footballers
Women's association football forwards
Karadeniz Ereğlispor players
Konak Belediyespor players
Ataşehir Belediyespor players
ALG Spor players
Turkish Women's Football Super League players
Turkey women's international footballers
Galatasaray S.K. women's football players